Cavite is a province in the Philippines.

Cavite may also refer to:

 Cavite City
 Cavite Peninsula
 Cavite (film)
 Naval Base Cavite, officially Naval Station Pascual Ledesma, and also known as Cavite Naval Base or Cavite Navy Yard

See also
 Cavity (disambiguation)